Ilke Gers (born 26 October 1981) is a visual artist and a retired tennis player from New Zealand.

Art career 
Ilke Gers works with installation, performance and publications that bring movement, behaviour, social and spatial conditions into play. She studied at the Werkplaats Typografie, and was a resident at the Jan van Eyck Academie from 2014-2015. Her work has been presented at LLS Paleis, Antwerp; the Biënnale Van België, Ghent; Kunsthal Rotterdam; De Appel, Amsterdam; 019, Ghent; De Fabriek, Eindhoven; Beursschouwburg, Brussels; D21 – Kunstraum, Leipzig. She is part of Action Publishing Collective, based in Rotterdam.

Tennis career 
Ilke Gers is a former New Zealand professional female tennis player. Gers has won two doubles titles on the ITF circuit in her career. On 13 May 2002, she reached her best singles ranking of world number 382. On 2 February 2004, she peaked at world number 167 in the doubles rankings.

Ilke Gers retired from tennis 2004.

Playing for New Zealand at the Fed Cup, Gers has a win–loss record of 4–5.

ITF finals (2–8)
Singles (0–1)

Doubles (2–7)

Fed Cup participation
Singles

Doubles

ITF Junior Results
Doubles (1/0)

References

External links 
 
 

1981 births
Living people
New Zealand female tennis players